Sago palm is a common name for several plants which are used to produce a starchy food known as sago. Sago palms may be "true palms" in the family Arecaceae, or cycads with a palm-like appearance. Sago produced from cycads must be detoxified before consumption. Plants called sago palm include:

 in the palm family (Arecaceae) native to Southeast Asia
 Cycads
 Cycas revoluta, (king sago palm), native to Japan and widely cultivated as an ornamental plant
 Cycas rumphii, (queen sago palm), native to southeast Asia
 Cycas circinalis, (queen sago palm), native to India